Peace Point 222 is an Indian reserve of the Mikisew Cree First Nation in Alberta, located within Improvement District No. 24 (Wood Buffalo National Park).

References

Indian reserves in Alberta
Wood Buffalo National Park
Cree reserves and territories